The Rise of Brutality is the third studio album by American metalcore band Hatebreed. It was released on October 28, 2003 by Universal Records.

Background 
"This is Now" proved to be the album's first single, frequently being played on MTV2's Headbangers Ball, a program which vocalist Jamey Jasta often hosted. The song was also included on the first MTV2 Headbangers Ball compilation album that same year. A second single would be found in "Live for This," with its music video dedicated to a deceased friend of the band. The song "Another Day, Another Vendetta," greatly samples the song "Just Look Around," by Sick of it All, borrowing the first verse.

The first song, "Tear It Down" is an extended version of the song "Outro" from the previous album Perseverance. Their song "Live for This" was nominated for a Grammy award in 2005. The bonus track "Bound to Violence" appeared on The Punisher (2004 film) soundtrack.

Track listing

Credits 
Writing, performance and production credits are adapted from the album liner notes.

Personnel

Hatebreed 
 Jamey Jasta – vocals
 Sean Martin – guitar
 Chris "The Xmas Bitch" Beattie – bass
 Matt Byrne – drums

Production 
 Steve Richards – executive production
 Zeuss – production, engineering
 Rob Gil – recording assistant, digital editing
 Phil Caivano – recording assistant, guitar tech
 Michael "Sully da Bull" Sullivan – production coordination
 Mike Fraser – mixing
 Misha Rajaratnam – mixing assistant
 George Marino – mastering

Artwork and design 
 Jamey Jasta – packaging concept
 Devastation Media – layout, design
 Jay Gelabert – packaging coordination

Studios 
 Planet-Z, Hadley, MA, U.S.– recording
 Armoury Studios, Vancouver, BC, Canada – mixing
 Sterling Sound, New York City, NY, U.S. – mastering

Charts

References

External links 
 

2003 albums
Hatebreed albums
Universal Records albums
Albums produced by Chris "Zeuss" Harris